The Port Area is a district of the city of Manila, Philippines. It is entirely a reclaimed land occupied by Manila South Harbor and Baseco Compound. It is bounded on the north by the Pasig River, facing the districts of Tondo and San Nicolas, on the west by Manila Bay, on the east by Intramuros, separated by Radial Road 1, and on the south by Ermita. Post-war developments at the Manila South Harbor eventually paved the way for the migration of people from the different provinces, making it one of the largest urban poor community in the Philippines.

Barangays
The district of Port Area is made up of 5 barangays, numbered 649, 650, 651, 652 and 653. Barangay 649 contains the Engineer's Island, now informally known as the Baseco Compound. The Island is regarded as one of the biggest urban poor community in the Philippines. All barangays of Port Area (barangays 649 to 653) belongs to Zone 68 of the City of Manila.

References

External links
 
 

 
Districts of Manila